Raymond Vouel (8 April 1923 – 12 February 1987) was a Luxembourg politician.  Vouel was Deputy Prime Minister in the Thorn-Vouel cabinet, a coalition between Vouel's Luxembourg Socialist Workers' Party and Gaston Thorn's Democratic Party.  On 21 July 1976, Vouel left the government to join the European Commission as Commissioner for Competition.

References

|-

|-

1923 births
1987 deaths
Deputy Prime Ministers of Luxembourg
European Commissioners for Competition
Ministers for Finances of Luxembourg
Luxembourgian European Commissioners
Luxembourg Socialist Workers' Party politicians
People from Rumelange
European Commissioners 1977–1981